Escape from Pretoria is a 2020 South African prison film co-written and directed by Francis Annan, based on the real-life prison escape by three political prisoners in South Africa in 1979, starring Daniel Radcliffe and Daniel Webber. It is based on the 2003 book Inside Out: Escape from Pretoria Prison by Tim Jenkin, one of the escapees.

It was filmed in Adelaide, South Australia, in early 2019, both on location in the city and suburbs and in the Glenside studios of the South Australian Film Corporation.

Plot

In 1979, Tim Jenkin and Stephen Lee; two white South Africans, are carrying out anti-apartheid missions in South Africa. They are arrested on the spot and prosecuted; Jenkin is sentenced to twelve years and Lee is sentenced to eight. At the courthouse Lee attempts to escape but to no avail. Transported to Pretoria Prison, they meet Denis Goldberg, an older political prisoner serving four life sentences for previous work against apartheid. He shows them the ropes but discourages them from trying to escape.

Jenkin and Lee discuss escaping with another prisoner, Leonard Fontaine. They settle in and go about their daily routines, but Jenkin starts to analyze the prison and think of ways to escape. He steals items from the wood shop to make wooden keys that fit the locks to their cells. He sneaks around the prison at night, making keys for other locks. Lee and Jenkin bury these keys in the prison garden while tending it and make many other preparations for their escape.

Fontaine and Jenkin do a test run by using keys to leave their cells. They hide in a closet as the night guard walks by. They use another key to leave the cell block, but they have to run back to their cells before they can use another key. The guards search everyone's cells the next day but fail to find anything. Later, Jenkin discovers that a new gun tower is being built. He, Fontaine and Lee present their plan to Goldberg and other prisoners who decide against trying to escape with them.

Jenkin, Lee and Fontaine execute their plan. They gather keys hidden in various areas and change into previously smuggled street clothes. Once again, they hide in the closet to evade the night guard. Unexpectedly, the night guard comes back to the closet. Goldberg short-circuits the light in his cell, causing the electricity to go out and calls for the guard, distracting him so that the trio can reach the last door. They cannot get any of the keys to work on this door, but Fontaine breaks it open using a chisel and screwdriver. They leave the prison and find a taxi driven by a black taxi driver to take them out of Pretoria after offering him cash he had received before he was put into trial.

It transpires that the biggest manhunt ensued in the aftermath, but they managed to escape to London via Mozambique, and Tanzania. The three would continue their protests against apartheid under the African National Congress Party; they were ultimately pardoned in 1991. Goldberg was finally freed in 1985 after spending 22 years in prison. In 1992, a year after Jenkin, Lee and Fontaine's exoneration, the apartheid fell.

Cast
 Daniel Radcliffe as Tim Jenkin
 Daniel Webber as Stephen Lee
 Ian Hart as Denis Goldberg
 Mark Leonard Winter as Leonard Fontaine (character based on Alex Moumbaris)
 Nathan Page as Mongo
 Grant Piro as Captain Schnepel
 Adam Ovadia as Van Zadelhoff
 Adam Tuominen as Jeremy Cronin
 Tim Jenkin as a prisoner in the prison waiting room (extra, non-speaking role)

Production
The film was written and directed by Francis Annan. The film is an Australia-UK co-production, co-financed by Arclight Films, New York-based Magna Entertainment and with the assistance of the South Australian Film Corporation. Sam Neill was originally cast as Goldberg, in May 2017.

Filming commenced on location in Adelaide, South Australia, in March 2019, with some scenes being shot at Mitcham railway station and others in the centre of the city, in Pirie Street. Jenkin spent some time in Adelaide, advising Radcliffe on accent and other aspects of the film, as well as playing as an extra, playing a prisoner next to Radcliffe in the visiting room.

The film contains two pieces of music by the Austrian composer Wolfgang Amadeus Mozart: The Dies Irae from his Requiem Mass in D minor and the Kyrie from his Mass in C minor. The latter was also featured prominently in a classic prison film, A Man Escaped directed by Robert Bresson.

Release
Escape from Pretoria was released on 6 March 2020 in the United Kingdom by Signature Entertainment and in the United States by eOne and Momentum Pictures. It was released for rental on digital platforms iTunes, Sky Store, Amazon Prime Video and Virgin on the same date, and had a limited cinema release in the UK, US and some other countries. It became available to buy on DVD and Blu-ray from 20 April 2020.

The film was screened on 11 July 2020 at select cinemas in Adelaide as part of Adelaide Film Festival, after cinemas had just reopened in the wake of the COVID-19 pandemic in Australia.

Reception
The website's critics consensus reads: "Escape from Pretoria doesn't quite do justice to the fact-based story it's dramatizing, but that lack of depth is offset by suitably gripping jailbreak action." On Metacritic, the film has a weighted average score of 56 out of 100, based on 7 critics, indicating "mixed or average reviews".

Footnotes

References

Further reading

External links
 

2020 films
2020 thriller films
Apartheid films
Australian thriller films
British films based on actual events
British prison drama films
British thriller films
Films about prison escapes
Films based on non-fiction books
Films shot in Adelaide
Films shot in South Australia
Films set in 1979
Thriller films based on actual events
Films directed by Francis Annan
2020s English-language films
2020s British films